George William Cooper (May 21, 1851 – November 27, 1899) was an American lawyer and politician who served three terms as a U.S. Representative from Indiana from 1889 to 1895.

Background
Born near Columbus, Indiana, Cooper attended the country schools, and was graduated in the academic and law courses from the Indiana University at Bloomington in 1872.

Career
He was admitted to the bar and commenced practice in Columbus, Indiana.

He served as prosecuting attorney of Columbus in 1872.

He served as mayor of Columbus in 1877, and was the city attorney of Columbus from 1879 to 1883.

Cooper was elected as a Democrat to the Fifty-first, Fifty-second, and Fifty-third Congresses (March 4, 1889 – March 3, 1895). He served as chairman of the Committee on Irrigation of Arid Lands in the Fifty-third Congress.

He was an unsuccessful candidate for reelection in 1894 to the Fifty-fourth Congress.

He resumed the practice of law in Columbus, Indiana.

Personal and death
He was the father of Kent Cooper of the Associated Press.

He died in Chicago, Illinois on November 27, 1899. He was interred in Garland Brook Cemetery, Columbus, Indiana.

References

1851 births
1899 deaths
People from Columbus, Indiana
Indiana University Maurer School of Law alumni
Democratic Party members of the United States House of Representatives from Indiana
19th-century American politicians